was a Japanese jidaigeki actor. He was born Toraichi Meguro in Nagaoka, Niigata. Debuting at Ajia Eiga in 1934, Konoe appeared in jidaigeki at Daito Eiga, Shochiku, and Toei, the latter having him star in a popular series about Yagyu Jubei. Konoe was known for his dazzling swordplay and appeared in over 200 movies and TV dramas.  He retired in 1973 due to his worsening diabetes.

Konoe's sons Hiroki Matsukata and Yūki Meguro are actors.

Filmography
List of acting performances in film and television

References

External links
 
 Chambara Movie Star, Jushiro Konoe

1914 births
1977 deaths
People from Nagaoka, Niigata
20th-century Japanese male actors